Meros may refer to:
Meros is Greek for a part, portion, share.

People with the surname
Dave Meros, American musician who played bass guitar for Spock's Beard
Mike Meros, American musician who played keyboard for the Beach Boys

See also
 Mero (disambiguation)
 -mer, the modern English corresponding affix